Forbes-Watson's swift (Apus berliozi) is a species of swift in the family Apodidae.
It breeds in coastal areas of Somalia and the southern Arabian Peninsula and on the island of Socotra. In the non-breeding season it has been observed as far south as coastal Mozambique.

References

Apus (genus)
Birds of the Horn of Africa
Birds of the Arabian Peninsula
Fauna of Socotra
Birds described in 1965
Taxonomy articles created by Polbot